Luciano Federici (16 May 1938 – 18 March 2020) was an Italian professional footballer. He played in all three of Italy's top professional leagues, including for Carrarese, Cosenza and Pisa.

On 18 March 2020, Federici died from COVID-19, amid its pandemic in Italy.

References

External links
 

1938 births
2020 deaths
Italian footballers
Carrarese Calcio players
Cosenza Calcio players
Serie A players
Serie B players
Serie C players
Association football defenders
Pisa S.C. players
People from Carrara
Deaths from the COVID-19 pandemic in Tuscany
Sportspeople from the Province of Massa-Carrara
Footballers from Tuscany